Mark Wiens is an American travel and food blogger, vlogger, YouTube personality, television host, and restaurateur based in Bangkok, Thailand.

Personal life 
Wiens was born in Phoenix, Arizona to a family of Christian missionaries. He is of Germanic and Chinese origin. He has lived with his family in France, the Democratic Republic of Congo, and Nairobi, Kenya. He attended Arizona State University, graduating in 2008 with a Bachelor's degree in Global Studies. After graduation, Wiens traveled through South America, and got a job teaching English in the mountains of Patagonia.

Wiens met his wife Ying while teaching English in Thailand. Their son was born in 2016.

Career 
Wiens is considered one of the most popular food vloggers.

Wiens watched Anthony Bourdain while a student and called him a pioneer.

In 2009, Wiens started Migrationology.com, his food blog. In 2012, published an e-book, the Eating Thai Food Guide, and quit his job to begin blogging and making YouTube videos full-time. Wiens' travel vlog videos document his visits to dozens of countries. He has been featured as a Thai food expert by New York Magazine, CNN, and Andrew Zimmern.

In 2019, Wiens, along with Khun Tan (Thai food blogger), Khun Pongthep (designer and actor), Chef Gigg (Chef and Thai Iron Chef Champion) opened a restaurant, เผ็ดมาร์ค (Phed Mark), in Bangkok, specializing in ผัดกะเพรา (pad kaprao).

In 2022, Wiens was announced as the host of the HBO Asia series Food Affair with Mark Wiens. The series, made in partnership with the Singapore Tourism Board, focuses on Singaporean cuisine.

Publications

Filmography

References

External links
 Migrationology
 Personal website

Food and cooking YouTubers
Mark Wiens
Living people
Year of birth missing (living people)
Arizona State University alumni
American restaurateurs